The Grass Orphan is a 1922 British silent drama film directed by Frank Hall Crane and starring Margaret Bannerman, Reginald Owen and Douglas Munro. It was based on the 1913 novel The Paupers of Portman Square by I.A.R. Wylie.

Cast
 Margaret Bannerman
 Reginald Owen
 Douglas Munro
 Lawford Davidson

References

Bibliography
 Low, Rachael. The History of British Film, Volume 4 1918-1929. Routledge, 1997.

External links
 

1922 films
British drama films
British silent feature films
Films directed by Frank Hall Crane
1922 drama films
Films based on Australian novels
Ideal Film Company films
British black-and-white films
Films based on works by I. A. R. Wylie
1920s English-language films
1920s British films
Silent drama films